Khaled Hmani (born 3 January 1986) is a Tunisian professional footballer who plays as a defender for Jordanian club Al-Salt.

References

External links
 

1986 births
Living people
Tunisian footballers
US Monastir (football) players
ES Hammam-Sousse players
CA Bizertin players
Association football defenders
Tunisian Ligue Professionnelle 1 players
Tunisian expatriate footballers
Expatriate footballers in Jordan
Tunisian expatriate sportspeople in Jordan
Jordanian Pro League players
Al-Salt SC players